Shal (also Romanized as Shāl) is a village in Shal Rural District of Shahrud District, Khalkhal County, Ardabil province, Iran. At the 2006 census, its population was 1,594 in 378 households. The following census in 2011 counted 881 people in 295 households. The latest census in 2016 showed a population of 1,217 people in 397 households; it was the largest village in its rural district.

References 

Khalkhal County

Towns and villages in Khalkhal County

Populated places in Ardabil Province

Populated places in Khalkhal County